Valley View, Missouri may refer to the following places in the U.S. state of Missouri:
Valley View, Benton County, Missouri
Valley View, Sainte Genevieve County, Missouri